The Orchestre symphonique et lyrique de Nancy is a French symphony orchestra based in the city of Nancy in the province of Lorraine, France.  The orchestra consists of 66 musicians giving approximately 20 performances a year, mainly in the Opéra national de Lorraine and in the Salle Poirel, as well as other halls in Lorraine.  The orchestra also accompanies all productions of the Opéra national de Lorraine.

History
The precursor ensemble was established in 1884 as a municipal orchestra, with guidance from Edouard Brunel, the director of the Conservatoire de Nancy, and gave its first concert on 27 June 1884.  In 1889, the composer Joseph-Guy Ropartz, a successor to Brunel as director of the Conservatoire, and the director of the opera, Albert Carré, set up a season of symphonic concerts taking place in the Salle Poirel, built specifically for this purpose.  In 1979, the orchestra became independent in 1979 and took its current name. 

The most recent music director of the orchestra was Rani Calderon, from 2015 to 2018.  Calderon had previously served as principal guest conductor of the orchestra in the 2014-2015 season.  In October 2020, Marta Gardolińska first guest-conducted the orchestra, in the French premiere of Der Traumgörge of Alexander von Zemlinsky, as presented by the Opéra national de Lorraine.  On the basis of this appearance, in January 2021, the orchestra announced the appointment of Gardolińska as its next music director, effective with the 2021-2022 season, with an initial contract of three seasons.  Gardolińska is the first female conductor ever to be named to this post.

Music directors
 Noël Lancien (1971–1979)
 Jérôme Kaltenbach (1979–1998)
 Sebastian Lang-Lessing (1999–2006)
 Paolo Olmi (2006–2010)
 Tito Muñoz (2011–2013)
 Rani Calderon (2015–present)
 Marta Gardolińska (designate, effective autumn 2021)

References

External links
 Opéra national de Lorraine official website 
 History of the orchestra 

French orchestras
Nancy, France
Musical groups established in 1884
1884 establishments in France
Organizations based in Grand Est